Jess Harnell (born December 23, 1963) is an American voice actor and singer. His notable roles include Wakko Warner in Animaniacs, Captain Hero in Drawn Together, Jerry Lewis in the first two seasons of Totally Spies, Ironhide in the first three Transformers films produced by Michael Bay, and Crash Bandicoot in the video game franchise of the same name. Harnell has also been the announcer for America's Funniest Home Videos since 1998.

Early life
Harnell was born on December 23, 1963 at Englewood Hospital and Medical Center in Englewood, New Jersey, and grew up in nearby Teaneck, the son of Joe Harnell (a jazz composer) and his wife Alice.

Career
In 1989, Harnell provided the voices of Br'er Rabbit and many other critters for the Splash Mountain attraction at Disneyland Park. Harnell also recorded some new character dialogue for the subsequent Walt Disney World version of the attraction. He has continued to reprise the role of Brer Rabbit in new Disney projects when needed, such as in the 2011 video game Kinect: Disneyland Adventures.

In 1990, Harnell served as a casting director on DuckTales the Movie: Treasure of the Lost Lamp. In 1993, he went on to voice Wakko Warner on Animaniacs and Secret Squirrel on 2 Stupid Dogs. That same year, he became the singing voice of father in the current version of Walt Disney's Carousel of Progress. From 1994 to 1996, he supplied the voices of Sewer Urchin, the Human Bullet and Chief Louder in the animated series The Tick.

Also, in 1996, Harnell voiced Hunter in Road Rovers. One of Harnell's next appearances was as the principal stormtrooper in the 1997 Star Wars fan film Troops, a parody of Cops set in the Star Wars expanded universe. Harnell voiced Rudy's father, Joe Tabootie on the Nickelodeon show ChalkZone, Crash Bandicoot in Crash Tag Team Racing, Crash of the Titans, Crash: Mind over Mutant, and Crash Bandicoot N Sane Trilogy, Lo-Lo in Crash Bandicoot: The Wrath of Cortex, Rodney Copperbottom in the Robots video game, Spyro the Dragon in Spyro: A Hero's Tail and Spyro: Shadow Legacy, Marlin, Bruce and Crazy Drivers in the Finding Nemo video game, Jerry Lewis in the first two seasons of Totally Spies, Linguni in Pucca and Doctor Finklestein in The Nightmare Before Christmas''' video game spin-offs, as well as in the Kingdom Hearts series. In 2005, he voiced Buzz Blister in Tom and Jerry: Blast Off to Mars and numerous other characters in subsequent Tom and Jerry features. He also voiced wild and energetic Cro-Magnon Doubledome from the Longhair and Doubledome cartoon shorts for Cartoon Network's Big Pick (also starring Daniel Davis as Longhair).

In 2001, Harnell was the singing voice of Buster on Lady and the Tramp II: Scamp's Adventure. He also voiced Captain Hero on Comedy Central's animated comedy Drawn Together and he also does the voices of Wooton Bassett and Bennett Charles on the radio drama Adventures in Odyssey, as well as playing the lead role of Finnian Jones for the Lamplighter Theatre Radio Drama. He also made appearances on Superhuman Samurai Syber-Squad. His voice also made an appearance in NASCAR Rumble, and is credited for in-game commentary in the follow-up game Rumble Racing. Jess also replaced Brad Garrett as the voice of Fatso during season 3 of The Spooktacular New Adventures of Casper. He also guest starred in Samurai Jack as he voiced Ringo and a waitress in the episode "Jack Under the Sea". He also produced the 2004 film Comic Book: The Movie along with Billy West, Mark Hamill, Eric Mittleman, Scott Zakarin and Roger Rose as well as playing the character Ricky. In 2006, he worked as a voice director on Pet Alien. In 2007, he replaced Neil Flynn as the voice of The Plumber in Ratchet & Clank Future: Tools of Destruction and Ratchet & Clank Future: A Crack in Time. He also voiced the Smuggler in that popular series.

In that same year, Harnell voiced the characters of Ironhide and Barricade in the Michael Bay-directed Transformers, making him the only voice actor to play both an Autobot (Ironhide) and a Decepticon (Barricade) in that film. He returned to voice Ironhide once again in Transformers: Revenge of the Fallen  and Transformers: Dark of the Moon as well as Barricade in Transformers: The Last Knight.

Harnell voiced a character in Up and replaced Brad Garrett as the voice of Professor Buffo in Special Agent Oso. He also voiced Flip Wreck, Blast Zone and Bucko in the Skylanders reboot of the franchise and Cowardly Lion and Reegull in Lego Dimensions. Harnell also provided the voice and singing voice of Cedric the Sorcerer from Sofia the First from 2013 to 2018.

Music career

Harnell released his only solo album, The Sound of Your Voice, in 1995. He is the lead vocalist in the pop/metal mashup rock band, Rock Sugar, which evolved from his previous band, Loud & Clear. With Loud & Clear or Rock Sugar, Harnell released five albums: Disc-Connected (2003), self-titled demo album (2007), Festival of Fire (2008), Reimaginator (2010), and Reinventinator'' (2021)

Personal life
On November 8, 2019, Harnell proposed to his girlfriend Cara Leanne. The couple married on November 19, 2019.

Filmography

Film

Television

Video games

Live-action

Theme parks

Soundtrack appearances

References

External links

 
 
 

1963 births
Living people
American male voice actors
American male video game actors
American male film actors
American male television actors
American male radio actors
Radio and television announcers
American male singers
American rock singers
American casting directors
American voice directors
Disney people
20th-century American male actors
21st-century American male actors
People from Englewood, New Jersey
People from Teaneck, New Jersey
Male actors from New Jersey
American impressionists (entertainers)
Audiobook narrators
20th-century American comedians
21st-century American comedians